"The King and I" is a song by American rapper Eminem featuring American singer CeeLo Green. It was released on June 16, 2022, as the fourth single from the soundtrack to the Elvis Presley biopic film Elvis (2022). It was later included on Eminem's second greatest hits album, Curtain Call 2, through Shady Records, Aftermath Entertainment, and Interscope Records.

Background
In an interview for KTLA, CeeLo Green spoke about the collaboration process, saying, "Me and Eminem have been friends for years; I've longed for an opportunity to work with him. He said, 'Hey man, can you do this for me? I need it really quickly, I need it tonight.' So when Eminem says he needs something tonight, you deliver."

Composition
Produced by Dr. Dre and Eminem, the song samples Presley's "Jailhouse Rock", and showcases the two artists taking turns paying homage to Presley: "'Cause me and Elvis jailed together like cellmates / Yeah, this the jailhouse, bitch and I don’t give a..." raps Eminem, before being joined by Green on the hook: "Middle fingers up, we 'bout to do this shit again". Eminem also references and interpolates Presley's song "Blue Suede Shoes" in a similar way he did on his song "My 1st Single" from Encore. Eminem name-drops rappers 2 Chainz and Wiz Khalifa, and reflects on the critics who have hounded his career: "I stole Black music, yeah, true / (For what?) Perhaps used it as a tool to combat school kids". He also points out the parallels between him and Elvis in the music industry: "One, he’s pale as me / Second, we both been hailed as king / He used to rock the jailhouse and I used to rock The Shelter."

Charts

Release history

References

2022 songs
2022 singles
Eminem songs
CeeLo Green songs
Shady Records singles
Aftermath Entertainment singles
Interscope Records singles
Song recordings produced by Dr. Dre
Song recordings produced by Eminem